Maxime Mourguiat (29 October 1900 – 10 January 1991) was a French racing cyclist. He rode in the 1925 Tour de France.

References

1900 births
1991 deaths
French male cyclists
Place of birth missing